Aleksandra Pivec (born 26 March 1972) is a Slovenian chemical engineer and politician who served as the country's Minister of Agriculture, Forestry and Food from 2018 to 2020 and Deputy Prime Minister from March to October 2020.

Early life and education
Pivec was born on 26 March 1972 in Ptuj. Her family is known for wine-making.

Pivec has a Bachelor of Science and a PhD in chemical engineering from the University of Ljubljana. Her thesis was on the optimisation of wine fermentation processes.

Career
Pivec worked at the Scientific Research Centre Bistra Ptuj for 17 years, including 6 years as its director. She served as state secretary at the Government Office for Slovenians Abroad from 2016 before being appointed Minister for Agriculture in the government of Marjan Šarec on 13 September 2018. She gained wide media exposure as a minister, appearing at numerous events across the country.

Pivec became leader of the Democratic Party of Pensioners of Slovenia on 18 January 2020, defeating Defence Minister Karl Erjavec, who then resigned. In the campaign leading up to the election, the media had focused on Pivec's failure to report money she made consulting for a state-funded tourism project to the anti-graft commission as required by law. She became Deputy Prime Minister in the government of Prime Minister Janez Janša on 13 March 2020.

Publications

References

Living people
1972 births
People from Ptuj
Women chemical engineers
University of Ljubljana alumni
Democratic Party of Pensioners of Slovenia politicians
Women government ministers of Slovenia
Agriculture ministers of Slovenia
Food ministers of Slovenia
Forestry ministers of Slovenia
Deputy Prime Ministers of Slovenia
21st-century Slovenian women politicians
21st-century Slovenian politicians